The 1985 Camel GT Championship season was the 15th season of the IMSA GT Championship auto racing series.  It was for prototypes in the existing GTP class and new, smaller Lights class, as well as Grand Tourer-style racing cars which ran in the GTO and GTU classes.  It began on February 2, 1985, and ended on December 1, 1985, after seventeen rounds.

Schedule
The GT and Prototype classes did not participate in all events, nor did they race together at shorter events.  Races marked as GT featured both GTO and GTU classes combined.  Races marked with All had all classes on track at the same time.

Season results

External links
 World Sports Racing Prototypes - 1985 IMSA GT Championship results

IMSA GT Championship seasons
IMSA GT